A private label, also called a private brand or private-label brand, is a brand owned by a company, offered by that company alongside and competing with brands from other businesses. A private-label brand is almost always offered exclusively by the firm that owns it, although in rare instances the brand is licensed to another company. The term often describes products, but can also encompass services.

The most common definition of a private label product is one that is outsourced, in which a firm is contracted to make a product under another name. However, it can also define products made in retailer-owned firms. For example, in 2018, The Kroger Company had 60% of its private brands produced by third parties; the remaining 40% was manufactured internally by plants owned by Kroger. Private-label producers are usually anonymous, sometimes by contract. In other cases, they are allowed to mention their role publicly.

Etymology
The term private label originated in retail, but has since been used in other industries as well. Probably the best known private-label brands are store brands, which are managed by supermarket and grocery store chains. Examples are Simple Truth by Kroger and Great Value by Wal-Mart. Store brands compete with national brands or name brands, like Coca-Cola or Lay's.

The term private-label product overlaps with the term white-label product. They are sometimes used interchangeably, but they don't mean the same thing. A private-label product is created exclusively for a client, who sets specific demands on what the product or service must contain. A white-label product is not created exclusively for one company, and although white-label manufacturers might offer customizations to their products, these are usually limited. The specifications of a private-label product are set out by the client, whereas a white-label product is more generic and already designed.

Store brands

In the supermarket and grocery store industry, the term private label/brand is almost always used, even if the same product is sold non-exclusively to multiple retailers with different packaging (white label/brand).

A store brand, also called a house brand or, in British English, an own brand, is a private-label brand trademarked and managed by a retailer. This brand is almost always offered exclusively at the chain store that owns it, although in rare instances the brand is licensed to another company. Examples of store brands are Simple Truth by Kroger, Great Value by Wal-Mart, and Specially Selected by Aldi. Store brands can also be eponymous, or named after the store, such as Joe's O's cereal by Trader Joe's. Store brands compete with national brands, also called premium brands or name brands, with its items sometimes being called brand-name products. Examples are Coca-Cola, Lay's, and Kellogg's. The general appeal of store-brand products is that they are usually offered at a lower price than their name-brand counterparts.

Most private-label store brand products are manufactured by third parties, but some are made by companies owned by the retailer. For instance, a vice-president of The Kroger Company stated in 2018 that approximately 60% of their private-label products are outsourced. The remaining 40% is manufactured internally: in 2018, Kroger owned 38 plants, including 19 dairy farms, 10 bakeries, and 2 butcheries, strategically spread across the US. Similarly, Safeway Inc. owned 32 plants as of 2012. Most retailers prefer to keep the identity of their suppliers private, and accordingly have non-disclosure clauses in their contracts, making it difficult to determine the producer of a private-label product. In a few cases though, the manufacturer is allowed to mention it publicly, is revealed through a product recall, or in rare instances, is stated on the product itself. For example, the bags of Kirkland Signature coffee by Costco feature the text "Custom roasted by Starbucks".

Private-label brands emerged in the 19th century. Until the early 20th century, their general focus was on delivering quality at a price below that of the national brands. In the first half of the 20th century, the quality of private brands diluted and their standards dropped. In their competitive struggle against national brands, low prices were considered more important than quality. In the second half of the century, this trend gradually reversed. As quality and visual appearance improved, private labels rose to prominence in the 1970s and '80s. By the 1990s, they were increasingly seen as a threat to the established brands. Also, from the '90s onwards, a premiumization of store brands began to occur, giving rise to more expensive premium private labels.

Generic brands are often associated with store brands. Generic products were first introduced in the United States in 1977, quickly winning market share from national and private-label brands. A 1981 academic article described them as products "without brand names, in very plain packages with simple labels and usually sold at prices below both the national and private brands with which they compete". Packages of generic products often feature only the name of the type of product it contains, e.g. "Cola" or "Batteries". Nowadays, the terms generic brand and store brand are sometimes used interchangeably. The term generic can be used as a pejorative toward store brand items that are perceived as bland or cheap.

A private-label brand is often produced by the same company that manufactures the national brand of that product. Different brands target different consumers. For instance, Kimberly-Clark makes Huggies diapers, but also produces a Walmart budget version. Allegedly, some store-brand items are identical to their name-brand counterparts: they are said to be literally the same product, except for the packaging and price. In other cases, a manufacturer can have multiple formulas for one product, creating a private-label version using one method and the national-label version using another. In 2007, a mass-recall of contaminated pet food products brought to light that more than 100 different brands of pet food, both premium- and private-label, were in fact produced by a single company: Menu Foods Inc. in Ontario, Canada. The ingredients and recipes they used differed substantially among brands, depending on what their clients specified.

In fast food
Fast food restaurant chains sell their products under their private-label brands. Their core items are usually fries and meat-based items, but they might also offer brownies, muffins, cookies, and salads. These private-brand products are offered alongside national-brand products, such as soft drinks by Coca-Cola or Pepsi, and ice creams co-branded with Oreo or M&M's.

In finance
A private-label credit card (PLCC) is a type of credit card that can only be used at a specific company or chain of companies. Since this is virtually always a retail business, they are also called store cards. The retailer partners with a bank that issues the cards, funds the credits, and collects payments from customers. The cards themselves are branded with the logo of the store, but not the bank. Examples are the Target Debit RedCard (issued by TD Bank, N.A.), the Walmart Reward Card (issued by Capital One), and the Amazon Store Card (issued by Synchrony Bank). PLCCs also do not carry the logo of the payment network (e.g. Visa or Mastercard), but they do use that network for transactions.

Private-label store credit cards are sometimes compared to but not the same as co-branded credit cards. These cards usually feature the logo of the payment network, and sometimes the logo of the bank. Unlike PLCCs, co-branded cards work like 'normal' credit cards, usable at any place where that type of card is accepted. For instance, warehouse chain Nordstrom offers a Nordstrom Store Card (private-label) and a Nordstrom Credit Card (co-branded), both issued by TD Bank, N.A. and using Visa's network.

See also
 Contract packager
 Rebadging
 White-label product
 Ghost writer
 Ghost developer

References

External links

 Private Label Manufacturers Association
 PLMA Trade Show
 StoreBrands.com

Brand management